The false-lobed astrapia, also known as the false-lobed long-tail, is a bird in the family Paradisaeidae that is a presumed intergeneric hybrid between a long-tailed paradigalla and black sicklebill. Another interpretation that has been put forward is that the only known specimen is an immature Elliot's bird-of-paradise.

History
Only one adult male specimen is known of this hybrid, coming from the Vogelkop Peninsula of north-western New Guinea, and held in the American Museum of Natural History.

References

Hybrid birds of paradise
Birds of New Guinea
Intergeneric hybrids